The ROH Top of the Class Trophy Championship was a professional wrestling championship intended for young wrestlers that was created and promoted by Ring of Honor (ROH).

History 
The ROH Top of the Class Trophy Championship was created in 2005 by Ring of Honor for ROH rookie competitor's to compete for and win but was deactivated and abandoned in 2008, Rhett Titus was the final holder.

Reigns

Combined reigns

See also 

 Ring of Honor
 ROH Dojo
 Ring of Honor Wrestling

References

External links 
 ROH Top of the Class Trophy Championship at Cagematch.net

Ring of Honor championships